Finding You is a 2021 American coming-of-age romantic comedy, Christian-based film written and directed by Brian Baugh, based on the 2011 young adult novel There You'll Find Me by Jenny B. Jones. It stars Rose Reid, Jedidiah Goodacre and Katherine McNamara. It was released theatrically in the United States by Roadside Attractions on May 14, 2021.

Plot
After an ill-fated audition at a prestigious New York music school, Finley Sinclair travels to a coastal village in Ireland to begin a semester studying abroad. There she meets heartthrob movie star Beckett Rush, who is shooting the latest installment of his medieval fantasy-adventure franchise. They begin an unlikely romance, but when forces surrounding Beckett's stardom threaten to crush their dreams, Finley must decide what she will risk for love.

Cast
 Rose Reid as Finley Sinclair
 Jedidiah Goodacre as Beckett Rush
 Katherine McNamara as Taylor Risdale
 Patrick Bergin as Seamus
 Saoirse-Monica Jackson as Emma Callaghan
 Judith Hoag as Jennifer Sinclair
 Tom Everett Scott as Montgomery Rush
 Vanessa Redgrave as Cathleen Sweeney
 Natalie Britton as Gemma Quinlan
 Fiona Bell as Nora
 Marion O'Dwyer as Molly
 Anabel Sweeney as Keeva
 Helen Roche as Fiona Doyle

Production
Filming was in Ireland, in and around Dublin, Clare, Offaly, Kildare, Cooley and Carlingford, Co. Louth; and also in New York City, Los Angeles and Nashville. In September 2020, it was announced that Roadside Attractions had acquired the film's US theatrical distribution rights from Red Sky Studios, Nook Lane Entertainment and MK1 Studios. The film's initial title, There You'll Find Me, was renamed to Finding You.

Release
The film was released theatrically in the United States on May 14, 2021, by Roadside Attractions.

Reception

Box office
Finding You was projected to gross $532,000-$1 million in its opening weekend. It made $323,000 from 1,314 theaters on its first day, and $954,000 over its opening weekend.

Critical response
According to review aggregator Rotten Tomatoes, 53% of 38 critics reviewed the film positively, with an average rating of 5.2/10. The website's critics consensus reads: "Although Finding You manages to fit every contrivance possible into its story, its charming fluff and sharp humor may be enough to win the hearts of romance fans."  Audiences surveyed by PostTrak gave the film a 71% positive score, with 46% saying they would definitely recommend it.

Giving the film 2.5/4 stars, Michael O'Sullivan positively reviewed the film for the Washington Post, writing that although it contained "no real surprises... Finding You kinda, sorta [works]." Plugged In reviewer Paul Asay opined that while the story is "fairly predictable", it illustrated well "that sex and romance aren't synonymous; that kindness matters; and that even in moments of disappointment, God may be operating behind the scenes." Tara McNamara of Common Sense Media also commented on the film's religious themes, writing that "the movie's faith-based elements has a mic-drop moment, but it happens without a single line of dialogue and isn't jarring or forced." McNamara gave the film 3/5 stars, praising the well-assembled cast and the setting in the Irish countryside, noting that the film was more a coming-of-age story than a romance.

In a mixed review for the Los Angeles Times, Michael Ordoña praised many of the cast members but criticized the film's determination "to be PG-clean" and Finley's character, saying she lacked personality. Giving the film a grade of "C", Adam Graham of the Detroit News opined that the film was heavily clichéd and lacked anything of substance "except for the exquisite greenery of Ireland." Kate Erbland of Indie Wire gave it a "C−" grade, deriding it for its predictability, but noting that it contained "brief moments of magic":

References

External links 
 
 

2021 films
2020s coming-of-age comedy-drama films
2021 comedy-drama films
American coming-of-age comedy-drama films
Films based on young adult literature
Roadside Attractions films
Films shot in Ireland
2020s English-language films
2020s American films